Jessica Lynn Gavora (born 1963) is an American conservative writer on politics and culture, a speechwriter, and a former policy advisor at the United States Department of Justice.

Early life and education
She was born in Fairbanks, Alaska, one of nine children of Paul (1931–2018) and Donna Gavora (1931-2017), the owners of shopping centers, beverage stores and other businesses. She grew up in Fairbanks where she played high school basketball against future Governor of Alaska, Sarah Palin. She studied political science and journalism at Marquette University, then earned a master's degree in American foreign policy and international economics from the School of Advanced International Studies at Johns Hopkins University in 1993.

Career
In the 1990s, she was director of programs at the New Citizenship Project, an organization which initiated the neoconservative Project for the New American Century. Gavora later became U.S. Attorney General John Ashcroft's chief speechwriter and was a senior policy adviser at the U.S. Department of Justice. She worked as a speechwriter and advisor for Nikki Haley during Haley's time as the U.S. Ambassador to the United Nations. She has written speeches for various public figures, including former House speaker Newt Gingrich, and former U.S. Attorney General Alberto Gonzales. In November 2010, Sarah Palin cited Gavora for her "important work" on Palin's book, America by Heart: Reflections on Family, Faith, and Flag.

Gavora is the author of the 2001 book Tilting the Playing Field: Schools, Sports, Sex, and Title IX, a critical review of the effect that gender equity policies have had on male and female school sports. She has written for conservative magazines including The Weekly Standard and National Review.

Personal life
Gavora has been married to conservative commentator Jonah Goldberg since 2001. She and Goldberg have one child and they live in the Washington, D.C., area.

References

External links
 Jessica Gavora, Author bio and overview of her book, Tilting the Playing Field
 

1963 births
American speechwriters
21st-century American women writers
Johns Hopkins University alumni
Living people
Marquette University alumni
Writers from Fairbanks, Alaska
Writers from Washington, D.C.
21st-century American non-fiction writers
American political writers
American women non-fiction writers